Nina Alexandrovna Andreyeva (12 October 1938 – 24 July 2020) was a Soviet and Russian chemist, teacher, author, political activist, and social critic. A supporter of classical Soviet principles, she wrote an essay entitled   that defended many aspects of the traditional Soviet system, and criticized General Secretary Mikhail Gorbachev and his closest supporters for not being true communists. In the rebuke published in the official party newspaper Pravda the essay was called The Manifesto of Anti-Perestroika Forces.

Career in chemistry 
She was born in Leningrad (now St. Petersburg), and was a chemistry lecturer at the Leningrad Technological Institute. She joined the Communist Party of the Soviet Union (CPSU) around 1966.

I Cannot Forsake My Principles 
Andreyeva's essay I Cannot Forsake My Principles (variously translated in English commentary) was published in the newspaper Sovetskaya Rossiya on March 13, 1988, at a time when Gorbachev and Alexander Yakovlev were either about to start on overseas visit or already abroad, and was initiated and approved by the secretary of the Communist Party's Central Committee, Yegor Ligachev. She was contemptuous of Perestroika and defended the Soviet leader Joseph Stalin. Of the Great Purges, "they are being blown out of proportion" she wrote.

Giulietto Chiesa, then Moscow correspondent of the Italian Communist newspaper L'Unità, found Andreyeva's original letter and discovered that it had been rewritten, only 5 pages of her 18 page typescript were published, much of the rest being thought too extreme. In the originally unpublished portions, Andreyeva commented that Stalin's critics wrote "in the language of Goebbels" and referred to "nations of little importance, like the Crimean Tartars and Zionist Jews."

Party officials critical of the reforms welcomed the published essay. Ligachev told the official news agency TASS to send the Andreyeva letter to local newspapers throughout the Soviet Union to publish it. It was much reprinted in the Soviet Union and East Germany, but it received no critical response in the media. The Leningrad party issued a television documentary apparently showing mass support in the city for the Andreyeva letter.

Not until after Gorbachev had returned from abroad, and following a two-day meeting of the politburo on March 24–25 to discuss the Andreyeva letter, did a response appear in Pravda on 5 April 1988. The Pravda article described the letter as containing "nostalgia, backward-looking patriotism," the work of "blind, die-hard, undoubting dogmatists." Gorbachev said later that many members of the Politburo seemed to share Andreyeva's views, and that he had to coerce them into approving the publication of an official rejoinder. Gorbachev described it as a direct attack "against perestroika."

Under the reforms, she told David Remnick of The Washington Post in 1989 that under Stalin "the country built socialism for 30 years" and stated: "Our media are lying about Stalin now. They are blackening our history." On then current conditions, she told him: "The political structure of an anti-socialist movement is taking place in the form of democratic unions and popular fronts." She said of Leningrad television: "they'll show an artist, a painter, who is supposedly a representative of Russian art. But excuse me, he is not a Russian. He is a Jew." She added: "You can say Russian, Ukrainian, why not Jew? Does it diminish the person? Why hide him behind some other nationality. Jew and Zionist mean different things, but all Zionists are Jews." In the Sovetskaya Rossiya letter, she attacked "cosmopolitan" conspirators.

For his book Lenin's Tomb: The Last Days of the Soviet Empire (1993), Remnick drew on his contact with Andreyeva.

Subsequent career
By July 1990, she was heading an organization called Yedinstvo (Unity) which aimed to return the country to the Bolshevik principles of Lenin and was planning to leave the CPSU. The New York Times described the group in August 1991 as "a haven for many hard-line Communists".

Andreyeva later played a leadership role in the formation of post-Soviet communist organisations. Founded in November 1991, the All-Union Communist Party of Bolsheviks (initially Bolshevik Platform), Andreyeva was the party general secretary and the party wanted a mass campaign to replace Boris Yeltsin. It saw itself as the successor to the CPSU. In October 1993, the party was temporarily suspended along with fifteen other organisations after President Yeltsin's repression implemented after a constitutional crisis. In May 1995 she was removed from the post as the head of the St. Petersburg Central Committee of the party for "lack of revolutionary activity."

Nina Andreyeva died in St. Petersburg on 24 July 2020.

Works

References

External links
Full text of I Cannot Waive Principles (archived) as published in Sovetskaia Rossiia on March 13, 1988
All-Union Communist Party Bolsheviks official site

1938 births
2020 deaths
Scientists from Saint Petersburg
Stalinism
Anti-revisionists
Russian communists
Russian Marxists
Soviet women chemists
20th-century Russian chemists
20th-century Russian women scientists
Science teachers
Neo-Stalinists
20th-century Russian women politicians
21st-century Russian women politicians